WASK-FM, "98.7 WASK" is an FM radio station licensed to the city of Battle Ground, Indiana.  The station operates on the FM radio frequency of 98.7 MHz, FM channel 254. .  The studios are located at 3575 McCarty Lane in Lafayette, Indiana.  The tower is located on South 30th Street in Lafayette, Indiana.

History
WASK-FM signed on the air in late 1992 as WIIZ, 98.7 The Wizard, featuring an Adult album alternative or Triple A format.  The original owners, Wizard Broadcasting, called the station a clone of Chicago's WXRT, which featured similar programming.  The station had a loyal following during its short existence.  However, due to the station being a standalone FM and given the fact that this was immediately before the modern rock revolution of the mid- to late-1990s, the station went bankrupt and shut down.

In 1994, WASK, Inc., owners of country music outlet, WASK-FM (K105) and news/talk station WASK (1450) acquired the defunct station and returned it to the air.  Initially WIIZ, went back on the air with alternative rock, but in March 1995, the station acquired 105.3's WASK-FM calls and became a news/talk simulcast of the company's AM 1450.  The Newstalk WASK simulcast was a success for 98.7, featuring high-profile national personalities such as Rush Limbaugh and G. Gordon Liddy, then-rising syndicated "hot talk" personality Tom Leykis as well as local morning (Don Pratt) and afternoon drive (Ski Anderson/Jim Walsh)programs.  In fact, the simulcast garnered the highest ratings in the United States for the FM "Hot Talk" format under programmer Keith Harris and consultant Doug Silver. WASK also featured high school and professional sports on the weekends with 1970s and 1980s classic hits music filling the other weekend dayparts.

Despite a successful run as a news/talk station, WASK dropped the format in September 1997 citing expense as the main reason for the switch.  The format was changed to oldies and "Kool AM & FM" premiered, featuring music from the 1950s through the 1970s.  Within a year, the name was changed again to "Kool Oldies WASK" and programming was streamlined to mainly late 1950s through early 1970s pop hits.  In 2003, WASK-AM-FM changed their name yet again to simply "Oldies 98.7 WASK."

In 2006, after over a 10-year run simulcasting with AM 1450, the two stations officially split programming. 1450 WASK would become an ESPN Radio affiliate as "ESPN 1450" becoming Lafayette's only AM commercial station running an independent format for over 4 years. WASK-FM changed its positioning statement from mentioning Oldies to "The Super Hits Of The 60s and 70s".

WASK-FM currently positions itself as "Lafayette's Listen at Work Station" and carries Indianapolis Colts football.

Schurz Communications announced on September 14, 2015 that it would exit broadcasting and sell its television and radio stations, including WASK-FM, to Gray Television for $442.5 million. Though Gray initially intended to keep Schurz' radio stations, on November 2, it announced that Neuhoff Media would acquire WASK-FM and Schurz' other Lafayette radio stations for $8 million.

References

External links
98.7 WASK-FM Website

ASK-FM
Classic hits radio stations in the United States
Radio stations established in 1993
1993 establishments in Indiana